Janusz Stokłosa (born 15 May 1954) is a Polish pianist and composer. He graduated from the Department of Theory and History of Music at the Jagiellonian University in Kraków (1978). From 1984 to 1990 he was the musical director of Ateneum Theatre in Warsaw, where he co-starred musicals: Brel, Hemar, Wysocki with Wojciech Młynarski and Janusz Józefowicz. From 1986 to 1991 he worked with Michał Bajor.

In 1991 he composed music for the musical Metro, directed and choreographed by Janusz Józefowicz. For the music for this musical Stokłosa was nominated for the Broadway Tony Award for Best Musical Score in the 1991/92 season. By January 2016 more than 1,900 performances of this musical were performed.

References

External links 

 

1954 births
Polish composers
21st-century Polish pianists
Living people
Jagiellonian University alumni